Knox Grammar School is an independent Uniting Church day and boarding school for boys, located in Wahroonga, New South Wales, an Upper North Shore suburb of Sydney, Australia. Founded in 1924 by the Presbyterian Church of Australia as an all-boys school, and named after John Knox. The school has since grown, branching out into a large Senior School and a Preparatory School, enrolling approximately 2900 students. The school also caters for approximately 160 boarding students from Years 7 to 12.

Knox is affiliated with the Headmasters' and Headmistresses' Conference, the Association of Heads of Independent Schools of Australia (AHISA), the Junior School Heads Association of Australia (JSHAA), the Australian Boarding Schools' Association (ABSA), and is a founding member of the Combined Associated Schools (CAS).

In January 2015 the Royal Commission into Institutional Responses to Child Sexual Abuse announced it would conduct a public investigation into how Knox Grammar had responded to allegations of inappropriate conduct and sexual abuse by teachers towards students between 1970 and 2012. The Royal Commission found in September 2016 that the school's principal between 1969 and 1998 had covered up allegations of sexual abuse made against teachers.

History
Knox Grammar School was established on Sydney's North Shore in 1924, by the Presbyterian Church. The school was named after John Knox, the 16th century Scottish reformer, who planned a network of schools in every church parish. 

Knox opened as a Presbyterian Boys' School after founding members John Gilmore, William McIlrath, Robert Gillespie and Andrew Reid purchased the original property, 'Earlston', as the first school building. Now the Gillespie Heritage House, 'Earlston' was previously owned by Sir Charles Mackellar, was designed by architects Spain & Cosh, and built in 1908 for W. Moses Esq., Warrawee.

The school was officially opened by the Hon. Sir George Fuller KCMG, Premier of New South Wales, on 5 February 1924. Under the founding headmaster Neil MacNeil, a Rhodes Scholar, Knox grew rapidly and survived the Great Depression. Student numbers rose from 28 in 1924 to over 300 in 1939.

In 1939, William Bryden FRSE (1904-1992) took over the role of headmaster. As World War II broke out, around 370 Old Knox Grammarians served in the armed forces. 53 of them lost their lives and are now commemorated in the John Williams Memorial Hall, the School Chapel, the Old Students' War Memorial, and the original Science Building. The school's Pipe Band was established during Bryden's period as headmaster.
John Mill Couper, a Scot, became headmaster in 1953. Couper focused on broadening the School's education, with attention to music and art, however, problems culminated in Couper's departure from a divided Knox in 1955.

T. Ross McKenzie, former head of Brisbane Boys' College, replaced Couper. The school's fifth headmaster, Ian Paterson, initiated further developments including a substantial building program. During this period three teachers sexually abused students; these teachers were later convicted and it has been alleged that other teachers abused students. In 2015 Paterson told the Royal Commission into Institutional Responses to Child Sexual Abuse that he had failed to protect students from abuse.

In 1999, Peter Crawley, former Head of Trinity Grammar School in Melbourne, became Knox's sixth headmaster.

Headmasters

Motto
Knox's school motto is a Latin phrase, which has been translated variously as being "Do the Manly Thing" (The translation most common in the Preparatory School), "The manly thing is being done".

Campus

There are several locations throughout Sydney.

Facilities

Knox's senior campus includes the Great Hall and Aquatic Centre (opened August 2011), sports facility, gymnasium, squash and weights rooms, music and drama centres, two boarding houses (one opened September 2010) and the new performing arts academy (opened late 2019). Knox owns several major sporting fields including one on campus at the Senior School, two on campus at the Prep School, and two off campus in Warrawee and neighbouring North Turramurra.

Since 2006 the school has been actively involved in the Future Problem Solving Program.

Building projects
Knox has in recent years completed new buildings at both the Senior and Prep Schools. The Senior School's KG1 Building opened in 2007. The KG1 Project The Prep School's K-2 Centre, opened in 2004, provided new classroom, library, art and music facilities for Years K-2 students.

The new Boarding Centre was finished in September 2010. The Great Hall and Aquatic Centre project, was finished August 2011. 
  
The Great Hall/Aquatic Centre building won several design awards in 2012.

Construction for the new Knox Senior Student Academy began in 2014, with construction continuing to August 2015 and the academy being officially opened in October 2015. The building houses the lockers of Year 11 and Year 12 students, as well as featuring a cafe, classrooms for Science as well as Finance and Legal classrooms, a Senior Library and a Lecture theatre.

In 2016, Headmaster John Weeks announced that Knox Grammar School would commence construction of a new Performing Arts Centre and Junior Secondary Academy in February 2017. It was completed in early 2019.

The Senior School's construction for a new locker area for Years 7-10 as well as a basketball court, which is in the process of refurbishing the KG1 Building for the new Middle Academy, was completed in early 2020.

House system

Boarding
Knox Grammar School provides boarding facilities for approximately 160 boarders. Boarding facilities have been available since the School's opening, in 1924

Gillespie (Maroon) – the original school house and is named for Robert Gillespie, a founder and benefactor of the School, and chairman of the School Council (1923–1945). It was later converted into a Boarding House, now known as "Gillespie Heritage House".
Boarding Centre – opened in September 2010, the Boarding Centre accommodates Boarders in 21st Century style.

Other Houses
MacNeil (Black) – originally MacNeil House was an expansion to Gillespie House, completed to add room to the new school. It is named for Neil MacNeil, the first headmaster of the School (1924–1938).
Adamson (Dark green) – John Adamson – a long-serving chairman of the School Council.
Angus  (Brown) – Rev Samuel Angus – a Professor of Theology at Sydney University and former member of the School Council.
Bryden (Grey) – Dr William Bryden – the second headmaster of the School (1939–1953). Also known as the cultural house. House mascot is the 'Bryden Squid'.
McIlrath (Dark blue) – William McIlrath – a founder and benefactor of the School and a long-serving council member (1923–1955). His widow contributed 50,000 pounds for the construction of the School chapel in 1960, which contains a Baroque organ by Ronald Sharp.
McKenzie (Orange). Dr Ross McKenzie – fourth headmaster of the School (1956–1969).
Montgomery (Lime green) –  Ross Montgomery – a School Council member (1953–1970) and benefactor of the School. His major gifts included the Montgomery Building and Gilmore House.
Murdoch (Red) – AM Murdoch – a long-serving School Council member (from 1938) and chairman (1855–1969)
Reid (Yellow) – Andrew Reid – a founder and benefactor of the School. A business leader, sole proprietor of James Hardie in 1912, he made many financial contributions to the School; he also built the Margaret Reid Home for Crippled Children in St. Ives, in memory of his late wife.
Sinclair (Purple) – George Sinclair – a school council member (from 1944) and chairman (1952–1955).
Turnbull (Light Blue) – Alex Turnbull – a founding member of the School Council, serving 1923 to 1947, and an elder at St Margaret's Church in nearby Turramurra.

Co-curriculum

Army Cadet Unit (KGSACU)

The Knox Grammar School Army Cadet Unit (KGSACU) comprises 1200 members, ranging from recruits (RECs) to Cadet Under Officers (CUOs). The KGSACU is an ACU within the NSW 2nd AAC BDE. Participation is compulsory from the start of Term 4 Year 8, through to the end of Term 3 Year 9 for attendees of Knox Grammar School, and offers voluntary participation for attendees at the Ravenswood School for Girls from Term 4 Year 8. After the completion of basic recruit training in their first year, cadets may decide to either discharge from the Unit, or attend a Promotion Course to attempt to attain a higher rank and/or continue into a Senior or Recruit company.

The Unit participates in combined Annual Field Exercise (AFX) at the end of Term 1, and holds its own Junior, Senior, and CUOs Promotions Courses during August each year. Additionally, the KGSACU holds ceremonial parades for the Old Knox Grammarians Association (OKGA), an ANZAC Day Parade to commemorate ANZAC Day (though held several weeks after the day itself), and a Passing-Out Parade at the end of the cadet year to farewell the Year 12 members at the conclusion of their service to the Unit.

Sport

Knox is a member of the Combined Associated Schools (CAS), and plays competitive sport against the five other member Schools namely, Barker College, Cranbrook School, St. Aloysius College, Trinity Grammar School and Waverley College. Trial and pre-season fixtures are played against the GPS and ISA Schools. Students may represent Knox in a variety of inter-school sporting fixtures played each Saturday throughout the term.

The Intra-School sporting programs includes House carnivals, Standards and Inter-School competitions open to all boys.

Participating in sport at Knox is compulsory in both the winter and summer sporting seasons.

Knox plays 5 weeks of sport against GPS schools, and then 5 weeks of sport against CAS schools

CAS premierships 

Knox Grammar School has won the following CAS premierships.

 Athletics (29) - 1929, 1931, 1933, 1935, 1937, 1938, 1939, 1957, 1959, 1961, 1962, 1966, 1967, 1968, 1969, 1970, 1971, 1972, 1973, 1983, 1984, 1985, 1992, 2001, 2003, 2004, 2006, 2007, 2008
Australian Football - 2021
 Basketball (9) - 1978, 1979, 1980, 1997, 2009, 2014, 2019, 2020, 2021
 Cricket (15) - 1936, 1940, 1941, 1991, 1993, 1996, 2004, 2005, 2008, 2009, 2010, 2011, 2012, 2014, 2016
 Cross Country (4) - 1993, 1994, 1998, 2006
 Diving (3) - 2007, 2009, 2011
 Rugby (25) - 1932, 1934, 1936, 1939, 1940, 1941, 1942, 1945, 1954, 1957, 1962, 1964, 1967, 1972, 1976, 1991, 1995, 1999, 2000, 2001, 2003, 2008, 2009, 2015, 2016
 Soccer (10) - 1993, 1999, 2000, 2005, 2006, 2012, 2014, 2016, 2020, 2022
 Swimming (34) - 1933, 1934, 1939, 1941, 1947, 1948, 1959, 1963, 1967, 1968, 1969, 1970, 1971, 1972, 1975, 1976, 1977, 1978, 1979, 1980, 1981, 1982, 1983, 1984, 1985, 1986, 1987, 1992, 2003, 2017, 2018, 2019, 2020, 2021
 Tennis Summer (17) - 1993, 1994, 1995, 1996, 1997, 1998, 1999, 2005, 2006, 2007, 2012, 2013, 2014, 2016, 2018, 2019, 2020
 Tennis Winter (9) - 2006, 2007, 2008, 2012, 2013, 2014, 2016, 2017, 2018
 Volleyball Summer (2) - 2002, 2009
 Water Polo - 2020

Music
Knox has a Gallery Choir and the Knox Symphony Orchestra (KSO). Its Symphonic Wind Ensemble (SWE) toured Spain and Portugal in December 2019.

The Ronald Sharp pipe organ in the school's chapel, built in 1965, is highly significant as the first of many Baroque revival (or Orgelbewegung) mechanical action pipe organs built in Australia in the latter half of the 20th century, and is a sibling to organs in St Mary's Cathedral, Perth Concert Hall, Wollongong Town Hall, and the Sydney Opera House.

Knox Grammar School Pipes and Drums
The Knox Pipes and Drums have toured globally. Most notably, the band toured the United Kingdom in 2016, visiting Scotland, Ireland, England and Northern Ireland. The band also competed in the 2016 European Pipe Band Championships at Forres as well as the 2016 All Ireland Pipe Band Championships in Malahide.

The Knox Pipes and Drums also toured Scotland, Ireland, Northern Ireland and England again in 2019. They participated in the European Pipe Band Championships, The All Ireland Pipe Band Championships and the Corby Highland Games. At the Corby Highland Games, The Knox Pipes and Drums won first place for every event that they entered in.

In Australia, the band have been State Champions, National Champions, and Best Drum Corps. The band was crowned at Grade 4 2018 National Champions.

In the nationals, the Drum corps of KGS were crowned National Champs. The band competed in the 2018 Australian Pipe Band Championships at Brisbane Boys College, Brisbane. The KGS Pipes and Drums took first place in Grade 4 for both the overall band and the Drum crops, hence the band was crowned Grade 4 National Champions.

The KGS Drum Corps won National Drumming Championships in 2016 and 2018.

Notable alumni 

Alumni of Knox are known as "Old Knox Grammarians" or "Old Boys", and may elect to join the schools alumni association, the Old Knox Grammarian's Association (OKGA).

Controversies

Sex offences by teachers 
The school attracted widespread media coverage in 2009, when criminal charges were laid against five former teachers for alleged sex offences between 1976 and 1990. All five teachers were subsequently convicted.

Royal Commission hearings 
 the Royal Commission into Institutional Responses to Child Sexual Abuse is conducting public hearings (commenced on 23 February 2015) concerning the response of Knox Grammar, and the Uniting Church, to complaints and criminal proceedings involving teachers who sexually abused students. The commission will examine the "systems, policies and procedures" involving the school's response to the complaints since 1970 and the experiences of former students sexually abused by teaching staff. The royal commission is expected to conclude in December 2017.

During hearings in early March 2015, several former Knox students and staff alleged that headmaster Ian Paterson did not refer several allegations of sex abuse he received to the police, despite there being a requirement for such allegations to be reported from 1988. The commission heard that in fact Paterson had never reported any student's allegation of sexual abuse to police during his thirty years in charge of the school. Paterson also stated that he had allowed several teachers accused of sexual abuse to resign and subsequently gave them positive references. Paterson denied that he had covered up the sexual abuse of students, arguing that he had responded to the allegations brought to his attention, and stated that "I should have known and I should have stopped the events that led to the abuse and its tragic consequences for these boys in my care and their families". Paterson stated that he was not aware that it was a crime for a teacher to grope or sexually proposition a student. Following the section of the hearing concerning Paterson, the then headmaster, John Weeks, stated that the school had changed considerably since the end of Paterson's period in the role and that Knox's Paterson Centre for Ethics and Business Studies would be renamed. He also stated that the school was actively reaching out and providing support to those who were affected.

Weeks also gave evidence to the Royal Commission. During this hearing he was questioned over why he had not sacked the teacher who was arrested in 2009 despite having received allegations in 2007 that the teacher had behaved improperly with a student during the 1980s. Weeks told the media that the allegations had not been detailed or specific, and he had received advice that "it would have been difficult on industrial grounds" to have dismissed the teacher. Weeks also stated that he had reported the teacher to the police child protection unit.

The Royal Commission issued its findings on Knox Grammar in September 2016. The Sydney Morning Herald stated that its conclusions were that "Paterson deliberately covered up allegations about child sexual abuse because he placed the reputation of the school ahead of student welfare". The Royal Commission also found that while principal Paterson had a "dismissive" attitude towards complaints of sexual abuse, "deliberately withheld information" from a police officer investigating allegations made against Knox Grammar staff, and did not notify the school's council or affected parents of complaints. In addition, it judged that a statement made as part of his evidence to the Royal Commission that he had only been aware of a single allegation of misconduct while principal was "clearly incorrect", as he had been aware of five allegations.

As of 1 March 2019 Knox Grammar School has not signed up to compensate its sexual abuse survivors through the National Redress Scheme, though it has indicated it plans to do so. The Royal Commission recommended the establishment of the National Redress Scheme, it commenced on 1 July 2018.

2019 incident 
On 5 August 2019, Nicholas Warby, the school's 30-year-old "Director of Aquatic Sports", was arrested for possession of "child abuse material" on his mobile phone.  After police searched his belongings and premises, two additional counts of possession of a prohibited drug were added.  Headmaster Scott James sent a letter to parents, saying that Warby had been "removed from his duties at the aquatic centre" and that "[the police] have advised us that there is currently no suggestion that the images relate to Knox boys or swim centre students."  The police prosecutor told the court that some files were "physically obtained" rather than sourced from the internet.

Discord Incident 
In September 2022, 150 students (majorly Year 9 Knox students, with some girls and boys from other schools being involved) were found to have been participating in a Discord chatroom titled 'Gang Gang' in which multiple racist, anti-semitic, misogynistic, homophobic, extreme anti-abortion messages and more had been sent. It was confirmed that no child abuse material was sent on the server. It was found that the chat was active for about two years, with the school becoming aware of it in August 2022 (in which it was discussed with parents, and where student withdrawals from the chat first began). Material from the group chat was provided to the NSW Police Force, and Knox's principle Scott James responded to the incident in a letter to parents, labelling the messages by students "unacceptable" and "contrary to the values and culture of Knox". The letter confirmed that students involved were either suspended or left the school, punishment decided on how much the student participated in the chat. Twenty students in the chatroom met Knox's requirements for disciplinary action.

Gallery

See also
 List of non-government schools in New South Wales
 List of boarding schools
 Lawrence Campbell Oratory Competition
 Knox Rugby Club
 St John's Uniting Church, Wahroonga

References

Further reading
 Mansfield, B. (1974). Knox, 1924–1974. Sydney: John Sands.

External links 

 

Boys' schools in New South Wales
Educational institutions established in 1924
Uniting Church schools in Australia
Boarding schools in New South Wales
Private primary schools in Sydney
Private secondary schools in Sydney
 
Member schools of the Headmasters' and Headmistresses' Conference
Rock Eisteddfod Challenge participants
Combined Associated Schools
Junior School Heads Association of Australia Member Schools
1924 establishments in Australia
Wahroonga, New South Wales